The 1921–22 New York F.C. season was the club's first season in the American Soccer League and the inaugural season of the league. The club previously played in the National Association Football League. New York F.C. finished 2nd in the league.

American Soccer League

Pld = Matches played; W = Matches won; D = Matches drawn; L = Matches lost; GF = Goals for; GA = Goals against; Pts = Points

National Challenge Cup

Southern New York State Football Association Cup

Exhibitions

Notes and references
Bibliography

Footnotes

New York F.C.
American Soccer League (1921–1933) seasons
New York F.C.